The Ida Gerhardt Poëzieprijs (Dutch for Ida Gerhardt Poetry Prize) is a Dutch poetry award named after classicist and poet Ida Gerhardt. The award was created by the municipal council of the city of Zutphen and is now awarded by the Stichting Ida Gerhardt Prijs. The award was created in 1998 and first awarded in 2000.

Winners 

 2000: Kees 't Hart, Kinderen die leren lezen
 2002: Anneke Brassinga, Verschiet
 2004: Lloyd Haft, Psalmen
 2006: Astrid Lampe, Spuit je ralkleur
 2008: Nachoem Wijnberg, Liedjes
 2010: Alfred Schaffer, Kooi
 2012: Henk van der Waal, Zelf worden
 2014: Pieter Boskma, Mensenhand
 2016: Peter Verhelst, Wij totale vlam
 2018: Menno Wigman, Slordig met geluk (awarded posthumously)
 2020: Marieke Lucas Rijneveld, Fantoommerrie
 2022: Anne Vegter, Big data

References

External links 
 

Dutch poetry awards
Awards established in 1998
1998 establishments in the Netherlands